Hugh Patrick Matheson (born 16 April 1949) at Ormiston near Hawick, Scotland is a British rower, author and landowner who competed in the 1972 Summer Olympics, in the 1976 Summer Olympics, and in the 1980 Summer Olympics.

Rowing
Matheson won the coxed fours with Christopher Pierce, Alan Almand, Dick Findlay and Patrick Sweeney, rowing for a Tideway Scullers and Leander composite, at the inaugural 1972 National Rowing Championships. The winning crew were then selected to represent Great Britain at the 1972 Olympics, Rooney Massara replaced Findlay in the men's coxed four event where the crew finished in tenth place after being knocked out in the semi finals. In 1974 he was a member of the British eight which won the silver medal at the Lucerne World Championships and was selected by Great Britain as part of the coxed four at the 1975 World Rowing Championships in Nottingham, the four just missed out on a medal finishing in fourth place in the A final.

The following year he later competed at his second Olympic Games at the 1976 Montreal Olympic Games, where he won the silver medal with the British boat in the eights competition. In 1978 he won the singles sculls at the 1978 British Rowing Championships, rowing for the Thames Tradesmen's Rowing Club.

Coaching
After retirement from competition he coached the Nottinghamshire County Rowing Association which had twenty five years of success at World level including lightweight men's World Champion crews and elite success all over Europe. In 1986 he became the rowing correspondent of the Independent newspaper in London and ten years later took over as rowing commentator on British Eurosport and for FISA, the International Rowing Federation. He retired from both in 2007. In 2018, in collaboration with Chris Dodd of the Guardian, he published 'More Power' the first biography of Jurgen Grobler the most successful coach in Olympic History. (Grobler learned his trade in the East Germany graduating from the national sports college in Leipzig 1969. His first Olympic golds came in 1976 and, with the exception of Los Angeles in 1984 which he missed due a boycott, his crews have been Olympic champions at every games since. In 2016 in Rio he coached the British eight and coxless four both of which won gold). This book was shortlisted for The Telegraph Sports Book Awards 2019.

Personal life    
He was High Sheriff of Nottinghamshire in 1997 and a Deputy Lieutenant of Nottinghamshire from 2004. As owner of the Thoresby Estate in Nottinghamshire he has managed the farming and forestry enterprises since 1975 and has served as a trustee on the Sports Aid Foundation (1981–1990) The National Trust (2000–2010) and Portland College, a specialist FE college for the disabled (chairman of Governors 2008–2014).

References

Publications: More Power 2018. HQ Harper Collins with Christopher Dodd.

External links
 
 

1949 births
Living people
British male rowers
Olympic rowers of Great Britain
Rowers at the 1972 Summer Olympics
Rowers at the 1976 Summer Olympics
Rowers at the 1980 Summer Olympics
Olympic silver medallists for Great Britain
Olympic medalists in rowing
World Rowing Championships medalists for Great Britain
Medalists at the 1976 Summer Olympics
Scottish Olympic medallists
High Sheriffs of Nottinghamshire